The 1978 Tennessee gubernatorial election was held on November 7, 1978. Republican nominee Lamar Alexander defeated Democratic nominee Jake Butcher with 55.8% of the vote.

Primary elections
Primary elections were held on August 3, 1978.

Democratic primary

Candidates
Jake Butcher, businessman
Bob Clement, Public Service Commissioner
Richard Fulton, Mayor of Nashville
Roger Murray 	
Shelley Stiles
Bill Jacox
William K. Jackson
Ben Miller

Results

Republican primary

Candidates
Lamar Alexander, attorney
Harold Sterling, State Representative
John H. Harper
Hubert David Patty, perennial candidate

Results

General election

Candidates
Lamar Alexander, Republican 
Jake Butcher, Democratic

Results

References

1978
Tennessee
Gubernatorial
November 1978 events in the United States